CANTAT is an acronym for Canada TransAtlantic Telephone Cable, a series of submarine communications cable systems linking Canada with the U.K. and later Europe. The first cable was a joint venture of Cable & Wireless and the Canadian Overseas Telecommunications Corporation (COTC) implementing national policies to establish a Commonwealth Round the World Cable System. The name has been applied to three systems.

CANTAT-1
CANTAT-1: Completed in 1961 by Cable & Wireless and Canadian Overseas Telecommunications Corporation (COTC). The system was installed in two segments as the first phase of the global system. The  transatlantic segment linked Oban, Scotland - Hampden, Newfoundland on White Bay. The second  undersea segment, linked by a  land line to the White Bay terminus and completing the link to mainland Canada, was laid between Corner Brook, Newfoundland - Grosses Roches, Quebec. The official inauguration of the system was on December 19, 1961 when Canadian Prime Minister John Diefenbaker answered a call from Queen Elizabeth II. It was decommissioned in 1974.

CANTAT-2
CANTAT-2: Completed in 1974 by the British General Post Office and Canadian Overseas Telecommunications Corporation (COTC). The  cable with 489 repeaters linked Beaver Harbour, Canada with Widemouth Bay, England. The cable was withdrawn from service in 1992 but the Canadian end was rerouted to Sable Island and recommissioned as SITIFOG 2000 until it was abandoned after developing a fault. 

The work on the U.K. end of the cable involved an accident in which Pisces III, engaged in repeater burial of the newly laid cable on the shelf off Ireland, sank.

CANTAT-3
CANTAT-3: The third CANTAT, operational 1994–2010, was a  system with a Canadian terminus in Nova Scotia and eastern termini at Vestmannaeyjar, Iceland, Tjørnuvík, Faroe Islands, Redcar in the U.K., Blaabjerg, Denmark to Sylt, Germany.

See also
Commonwealth Pacific Cable System

References

Transatlantic communications cables